En hederlig jul med Knyckertz (en: An honest Christmas with Knyckertz) was the 2021 Sveriges Television's Christmas Calendar (SVT). It started airing on 1 December 2021, and ended on 24 December the same year.

Plot 

11 year old Ture Knyckertz wants to celebrate an ordinary and "honest" Christmas with his family. Unfortunately his family are all petty criminals and thieves, so Ture feels like an outsider as he wants to live an honest life. When ”the rose from  Sinai” (a large mounted gem) gets stolen at the local church, Ture (whose biggest dream is to become a police officer) starts investigating to solve the mystery.

The series takes place in Earth in a parallel universe and is characterized by the absence of mobile telephones, television sets and computers, and the setting is hard to place in a specific time period.

Roles 
 Gizem Erdogan – Fia Knyckertz
 David Sundin – Bove Knyckertz
 Axel Adelöw – Ture Knyckertz
 Paloma Grandin – Ellen "Kriminellen" Knyckertz
 Claes Malmberg – Paul Isman
 Julia Dufvenius – Hildegun Wagner
 Filip Berg – Frank Flink
 Gunnel Fred – Stulia Knyckertz
 Vanna Rosenberg – Biskopen Kikki
 David Nzinga – TA Gisslander
 Ylva Lööf – Kristina
 Gina-Lee Fahlén Ronander – Lisa
 Peter Apelgren – Hobby
 Elisabeth Wernesjö – Byttan Bing Bång
 Nova Tiwana – Sara

References

External links 
 
 

Sveriges Television's Christmas calendar
2021 Swedish television series debuts
2021 Swedish television series endings